The 2023 Montana Grizzlies football team will represent the University of Montana as a member of the Big Sky Conference during the 2023 NCAA Division I FCS football season. The Grizzlies are led by 13th-year head coach Bobby Hauck and play their home games at Washington–Grizzly Stadium in Missoula, Montana.

Previous season

The Grizzlies finished the 2022 season with an overall record of 8–5 and a mark of 4–4 in conference play to place in sixth in the Big Sky.

Schedule

References

Montana
Montana Grizzlies football seasons
Montana Grizzlies football